The Mystery of the Sphinx is a 1993 television documentary about the Great Sphinx of Giza, with a central focus being the conflict of egyptologists against a number of modern geology and oftentimes fringe theory proponents of the Sphinx water erosion hypothesis. Charlton Heston is the host of the documentary, which features John Anthony West and geologist Robert M. Schoch.

Release

Television
The documentary was first aired by NBC as an hour long prime time special on 10 November 1993. It reached an estimated audience of 33 million. It was subsequently shown repeatedly on TLC and the Discovery Channel over the next decade.

Home media
Mystery was initially released by Goldhil Home Media as a 95-minute "extended version" on VHS in 1994, and re-released on DVD by UFOTV as a 95-minute "Special Edition" in 2005.

Reception
The VHS release was described in a 1994 review as "a fascinating combination of science and humbug."

Robert M. Schoch criticized the extended version of the documentary, saying "Unfortunately, the original documentary has since been re-edited and expanded with all sorts of extraneous material, some of which I am not at all happy about, and is currently being marketed by 'UFO TV'. It still contains the core material and is worth watching, but when you do so, please disregard the nonsense 'filler' that was inserted into an otherwise great show."

Accolades

John Anthony West received a News & Documentary Emmy Award in the "Outstanding Individual Achievement in a Craft: Researchers" category for the program on 8 September 1994. The documentary also received a nomination in the "Special Classification for Outstanding News and Documentary Program Achievement" category.

See also
The Mysterious Origins of Man

References

External links
 

1993 films
1993 documentary films
Documentary films about Egypt
Pseudoscience documentary films
Documentaries about geology
Documentary films about water and the environment
Great Sphinx of Giza